Kob Dhexaad is a town in the northeastern Bari province of Somalia, situated in the Bosaso District of the autonomous Puntland region.

References
Kob Dhexaad

Bari, Somalia